Jade is a municipality in the district of Wesermarsch, in Lower Saxony, Germany.

References

Wesermarsch